Eddy Planckaert (born 22 September 1958 in Nevele) is a former professional road racing cyclist from Belgium. In 1988, Planckaert enjoyed perhaps his best year by capturing the green jersey (points competition) at the 1988 Tour de France and winning the Tour of Flanders. In 1990, he won Paris–Roubaix, his second monumental classic, with the closest finish in the race's history beating Canadian Steve Bauer by less than a cm. A strong sprinter, Planckaert is one of the riders with stage wins at all three cycling Grand Tours.

Eddy Planckaert is the brother of fellow cyclists Willy and Walter Planckaert. Eddy is also the uncle of Jo Planckaert and the father of Francesco Planckaert. More than 10 years after his cycling career, the former racer got back into the public eye with a long running reality TV show about his family life, on Vtm.

After the 2016 Paris–Roubaix, Planckaert declared that second-placed Tom Boonen should have made a deal with eventual winner Mathew Hayman in order to fix the race and let Boonen win.

Major results

1974
 National Road Championships
1st  Newcomer road race
1975
 National Road Championships
1st  Newcomer road race
1977
 National Road Championships
1st  Junior road race
1978
 1st De Vlaamse Pijl
 1st Gent-Staden
1979
 1st De Vlaamse Pijl
 1st Gent-Staden
Tour de Wallonie
 1st Stage 2, 3 and 6
1980
 1st Omloop der Vlaamse Gewesten
 2nd Grand Prix de Waregem
1981
Tour de France
 1st Stage 14 
 1st Omloop Mandel-Leie-Schelde
 Three Days of Bruges–De Panne
 1st Stage 2
 1st Delta Profronde
Tour de Luxembourg
 1st Stage 2
2nd Flèche Hesbignonne
1982
Vuelta a España:
 Stages 1a, 1b, 2, 3, and 12
Three Days of Bruges–De Panne
 1st Stage 2
Tour of the Basque Country
 1st Stages 3 and 5a
2nd Tour of Flanders
2nd Brabantse Pijl
1983
1st Brabantse Pijl
1st Brussels–Ingooigem
Paris–Nice
 1st Stage 1
Four Days of Dunkirk
 1st Stages 2 and 5b
3rd Kuurne–Brussels–Kuurne
1984
 1st  Overall Tour of Belgium
 1st Stages 2, 4a and 4b
 1st Omloop Het Volk
 Paris–Nice
 1st Stages 1 and 5
 1st Grand Prix La Marseillaise
 1st Étoile de Bessèges
 1st Stages 1, 2a and 3b
 Tour of Switserland
 1st Stage 8b
 Tour Méditerranéen
 1st Stages 2, 4a and 4db
Three Days of Bruges–De Panne
 1st Stage 2
Four Days of Dunkirk
 1st Stage 2
 1st GP Marcel Kint
 2nd Belgian National Road Race Championships
 2nd E3 Prijs Vlaanderen
1985
 1st Omloop Het Volk
Vuelta a España
1st Stages 1 and 4
 1st Dwars door Vlaanderen
 Paris–Nice
 1st Stages 1 and 3
 Tour of Belgium
 1st Stage 4
 Tour of the Netherlands
 1st Stage 2
 Three Days of Bruges–De Panne
 1st Stage 2
 Ronde van Nederland
 1st Stage 2
 1st Acht van Chaam
 3rd E3 Prijs Vlaanderen
 3rd Delta Profronde
1986
Tour de France
 1st Stage 8
Vuelta a España
 1st Stages 3 and 7
 1st Grand Prix La Marseillaise
 Étoile de Bessèges
 1st Stage 1
 Three Days of Bruges–De Panne
 1st Stage 3
 Catalan Cycling Week
 1st Stages 1, 3, 4b and 5
 Tour of Belgium
 1st Stage 1
2nd Brabantse Pijl
2nd Brussels–Ingooigem
1987
 1st E3 Prijs Vlaanderen
 1987 Paris–Nice
 1st Stage 2
1987 Giro d'Italia
 1st Stage 5
 Tour Méditerranéen
 1st Stages 2 and 3
2nd Grand Prix de Denain
1988
 1st Tour of Flanders
 Tour de France
  1st Points Classification
Four Days of Dunkirk
 1st Stage 1
 2nd Scheldeprijs
 3rd E3 Prijs Vlaanderen
1989
 1st E3 Prijs Vlaanderen
 1st Omloop Mandel-Leie-Schelde
Vuelta a España
 1st Stage 5
 2nd Belgian National Road Race Championships
 2nd Trofeo Luis Puig
1990
 1st Paris–Roubaix
 Tirreno–Adriatico
 1st Stage 7
 Euskal Bizikleta
 1st Stage 3
Vuelta a Asturias
 1st Stage 6
 1st Tour of Limburg
1990
 5th Milan San Remo

References

External links
 
 Official Tour de France results for Eddy Planckaert

1958 births
Living people
Belgian male cyclists
Belgian Tour de France stage winners
Belgian Vuelta a España stage winners
Cyclists from East Flanders
Tour de Suisse stage winners
People from Nevele